Dar-e Bid Khun (also Romanized as Dār-e Bīd Khūn; also known as Bab Bīdkhan, Bāb-e Bīd Khvān, Bīd-e Khūnī, Bīdkhūn, and Deh-Bīd Khūn) is a village in Eslamabad Rural District, in the Central District of Zarand County, Kerman Province, Iran. At the 2006 census, its population was 72, in 15 families.

References 

Populated places in Zarand County